Darlington United Methodist Church is located in Darlington, Maryland.  It is a pre Civil War structure, built in 1852, with white siding, large windows, and many historically original architecture.  It is a church within the Baltimore Washington Conference of the United Methodist Church.  It is also one of two churches part of the Darlington Methodist Charge, the other being Dublin United Methodist Church in Street, Maryland.  Prior to July 2014, the church shared pastors with Rock Run United Methodist Church, located in nearby Level, Maryland.  There was a third sister church, Thomas Run Church which closed its doors in 1945.

History 

With the purchase of land, known as “Phillip’s Purchase” from Joseph Worthington, in 1832 a log structure was built on the present site.  It was later replaced in 1852 by the current frame structure, with a belfry and vestibule in 1892.  A great revival occurred in 1896, with 185 converts in approximately six weeks.

The Church celebrated its 100th anniversary in August 1932 and was joined by Thomas Run Church (also known as Watters Meeting House) and Rock Run Church.

The Church sold land in 1936 for the new Darlington Elementary School, which replaced the old Darlington Academy located across the street from the church.  The old academy building is now the home of Stephenson Lodge and Twice Blessed Thrift Store.

In 1956, the Christian Education Building was constructed and dedicated ten years in the presence of Bishop John Wesley Lord.  It was dedicated in October 1978 to Mr. Robert Hostetter, who built it.

Our Church was selected to be on the Christmas in Darlington Tour in December 1978, which included six other properties of the village and area.  The Church also started the Darlington Apple Festival, which officially began in 1986.

The inside of the Christian Education Building was severely damaged by a fire in December 2001 and was rebuilt in 2003.  The new organ was purchased in 2004 and dedicated to Miss Laura Bradford, a long-time Church member and first grade teacher at the Darlington Elementary School.

The Church recently celebrated its 175th Anniversary in November 2007.  We are one of 82 properties within the Darlington Historic District, which was listed in 1987 by Christopher Weeks.

Community activities

The Darlington United Methodist Church is very active in the local community.  Although Darlington, Maryland is a small and quaint little hamlet, the activities embedded in its life appeal to so many.  The biggest attraction of the year is the annual Darlington Apple Festival.  Its numbers surge into thousands.  It is the biggest fundraiser for the Church.  The Church also participates with the local Darlington Lions Club.

Nearby landmarks

 Conowingo Dam
 Havre de Grace
 Susquehanna River
 Chesapeake Bay
 Deer Creek Friends Meetinghouse
 Darlington, Maryland

Role of Ministers
The Role of Ministers since 1889:

1889 – 1891	G. R. SANNERS
1891 – 1893	J. W. FLEMING
1893 – 1895	H. M. THURLOW
1895 – 1898	ELMER LODIA DUTTON
1898 – 1900	W. D. PARRY WILLIAM
1900 – 1902	RICHARD N. EDWARDS
1902 – 1905	L. M. FERGUSSON
1907 – 1908	H. M. D. BEALL
1908 – 1911	J. THOMAS HART
1911 – 1915	L. ST CLAIR ALLENS
1915 – 1918	BURT CONSTANCE
1918 – 1921	R. H. K. GILL
1921 – 1923	REV. MULLINEAUX
1923 – 1926	STEVEN FITCH
1926 – 1928	WILLIAM BIGGS ELLIOT
1928 – 1931	LYNN ARBOGAST
1931 – 1934	RAYMOND E. MANLEY
1934 – 1937	HENRY J. MULLER
1937 – 1944	CHARLES H. MEAD
1944 – 1946	DONALD T. McINTOSH
1946 – 1947	VIRGIL T. MAYBRAY
1947 – 1948	HERBERT L. D. DOGGETT
1948 – 1949	CHESTER STEYER
1949 – 1951	GEORGE W. PFERDEORT
1951 – 1954	C. THOMAS SUBOCK
1954 – 1956	GLENN F. CLULOW
1956 – 1959	JOHN W. MACKEY
1959 – 1963	LUTHER W. STARNES
1963 – 1966	EDWARD L. THIGPEN
1966 – 1970	PAUL LEE GRANT
1970 – 1977	JOHN OLAN PRICE
1977 – 1983	WILLIAM B. HILL
1983 – 1988	RAYMOND KINGSBOROUCH
1988 – 1994	DARRYL C. ZOLLER
1994 – 1995	ALICE WESTBROOK
1995 – 1998	KHRISTA FERGUSSON
1998 – 1999	FINLEY GRAY
1999 – 2001	CHRISTOPHER CHARLES
2001 – 2013	GARY SIEGLEIN
2013 – 2014	JAMES W. RIDEOUT IV
2014 – 2016	JAMES KEVIN JOHNSON
2016 – 2019	LINDA YARROW
2019 – present	SARAH INGALLS-HOWARD

References

 Darlington United Methodist Church 
 "Maryland Historical Trust". Darlington Methodist Church. Maryland Historical Trust. 02-1969.
 Jones, F. C. (1947). "The Village of Darlington" 
 Farrington, H. W. (1930). "Kilts to Togs: Orphan Adventures" New York. The MacMillan Co.

External links
The Darlington Apple Festival https://web.archive.org/web/20110725221333/http://www.darlingtonapplefest.org/index.htm
The Darlington Lions Club http://darlingtonmd.lionwap.org/
The Baltimore Washington Conference https://web.archive.org/web/20110726150024/http://www.bwcumc.org/church/2375
Darlington United Methodist Church website https://web.archive.org/web/20110725220234/http://www.darlingtonumchurchmaryland.org/
Maryland Inventory of Historic Properties http://www.mdihp.net/dsp_county.cfm?search=county&criteria1=M&criteria2=HA&criteria3=&id=13663&viewer=true

Churches completed in 1852
19th-century Methodist church buildings in the United States
Churches in Harford County, Maryland
United Methodist churches in Maryland
Historic district contributing properties in Maryland
National Register of Historic Places in Harford County, Maryland
Churches on the National Register of Historic Places in Maryland
Darlington, Maryland
1852 establishments in Maryland